Granulomelon is a genus of air-breathing land snails, terrestrial pulmonate gastropod mollusks in the family Camaenidae.

Species 
Species within the genus Granulomelon include:
 Granulomelon adcockianum (Bednall, 1894)
 Granulomelon grandituberculatum (Tate, 1894)
 Granulomelon squamulosum (Tate, 1894)
Synonyms
 Granulomelon acerbum Solem, 1993: synonym of Granulomelon grandituberculatum (Tate, 1894)
 Granulomelon arcigerens (Tate, 1894): synonym of Granulomelon adcockianum (Bednall, 1894) (junior synonym)
 Granulomelon gilleni Solem, 1993: synonym of Granulomelon grandituberculatum (Tate, 1894)

References

External links
 Iredale, T. (1933). Systematic notes on Australian land shells. Records of the Australian Museum. 19(1): 37-59
 Iredale, T. (1937). An annotated check list of the land shells of south and central Australia. The South Australian Naturalist. 18(2): 6-59, pls 1-2
 Criscione F. & Köhler F. (2016). Snails in the desert: Assessing the mitochondrial and morphological diversity and the influence of aestivation behavior on lineage differentiation in the Australian endemic Granulomelon Iredale, 1933 (Stylommatophora: Camaenidae). Molecular Phylogenetics and Evolution. 94: 101-112

 
Camaenidae
Taxonomy articles created by Polbot